Bibliolatry (from the Greek βιβλίον biblion, "book" and the suffix -λατρία -latria, "worship") is the worship of a book, idolatrous homage to a book, or the deifying of a book. It is a form of idolatry. The sacred texts of some religions disallow icon worship, but over time the texts themselves are treated as sacred the way idols are, and believers may end up effectively worshipping the book. Bibliolatry extends claims of inerrancy—hence perfection—to the texts, precluding theological innovation, evolving development, or progress. Bibliolatry can lead to revivalism, disallows re-probation, and can lead to persecution of unpopular doctrines.

Historically, Christianity has never endorsed worship of the Bible, reserving worship for God. Some Christians believe that biblical authority derives from God as the inspiration of the text, not from the text itself.
The term "bibliolatry" does not refer to a recognized belief, but theological discussion may use the word pejoratively to label the perceived practices of opponents.
Opponents may apply the term "bibliolatry" to groups such as Protestants of a fundamentalist and evangelical background, such as the King James Only movement, who espouse biblical inerrancy and a sola scriptura approach (scripture as the only divine authority).

Christianity

Christianity may use the term bibliolatry to characterize either extreme devotion to the Bible or the doctrine of biblical inerrancy. Supporters of biblical inerrancy point to passages (such as 2 Timothy 3:16–17),
interpreted to say that the Bible, as received, is a complete source of what must be known about God. Critics of this view call it a form of idolatry, pointing to verses such as John 5:39–40
to indicate that Jesus asked humanity to relate to God directly rather than blindly relying on written rules.

Roman Catholicism and Eastern Christianity
Catholicism traditionally sees scripture and sacred tradition as prima scriptura (rather than sola scriptura, i.e. scripture alone), and has implicitly accused some Protestant sects of bibliolatry. Jaroslav Pelikan wrote about Unitatis redintegratio, "The Second Vatican Council of the Roman Catholic Church of 1962–1965 could speak with a mixture of genuine admiration and ever-so-gentle reproof about a 'love and reverence, almost a cult, for Holy Scripture' among the 'separated Protestant brethren. The three independent branches of Eastern Christianity have voiced similar opinions and, with Catholicism and some Protestant opinion, have a higher view of the apostolic succession of bishops than Protestants who derive their faith primarily from the Reformed tradition or hold evangelical or low church views.

Another influence on bibliolatry is the fact that nearly all of those who hold high views of the Bible's authority against tradition also tend to reject the deuterocanonical books found in the Septuagint as canonical; Catholicism, Oriental Orthodoxy and Eastern Orthodoxy include a varying number of deuterocanonical books in their Bibles; certain Protestants, such as Lutherans and Anglicans, include these books between the Old Testament and New Testament, calling them Apocrypha, and use them for purposes of edification, but not to establish doctrine; a complete King James Version of the Bible thus includes 80 books. Protestants tend to rely on the Masoretic Text of contemporary Judaism, which is rooted in the traditions of the Pharisees. Although Catholicism and Eastern Christianity do not fully agree about which books are deuterocanonical and which are not (with the Orthodox Tewahedo preserving the most inclusive set of books, many of which were not preserved elsewhere), the regard for the Septuagint held by the early church fathers is regarded as sound. Most Catholics and Eastern Christians agree with high-church Protestants that the Old Testament is best understood by studying the Masoretic Text and the Septuagint; modern Bible translations in these traditions often take both into consideration. The authority of the Protestant Reformers to reject books from the Christian biblical canon is seen as dubious. Those who view the Vulgate in Roman Catholicism, the Septuagint in Eastern Orthodoxy, the Peshitta in Syriac Christianity, or the Ge'ez Bible of the Orthodox Tewahedo as more authoritative than the Hebrew Old Testament or the Greek New Testament could be accused of bibliolatry for many of the same reasons that the King James Only movement is.

Southern Baptists

A change in wording of the Southern Baptist Convention's Baptist Faith and Message as a result of its conservative resurgence led to charges of bibliolatry.

Sikhism

Sikhism is a religion founded by Guru Nanak. It considers its scripture, the Guru Granth Sahib, as the living Guru. Sikhs install it in the sanctum of Sikh temples, and devotees reverentially greet it by bowing and prostrating before it. Since the early 20th century, Farquhar and other scholars consider it as a form of idolatry that believers practice the matha tekna (bowing down and touching one's head to the floor) at the door of a Gurdwara or before the Guru Granth Sahib, and other daily rituals such as putting the scripture to bed (sukhasan) in a bedroom (sachkhand), waking it up every morning, carrying it in a procession and re-opening it (prakash) in major Sikh Gurdwaras. When open in the sanctum of a Sikh Gurdwara, it is within an expensive brocade and attendants fan it as an act of homage.

According to James Moffatt, the ritual veneration given by Sikhs to the Guru Granth Sahib is "true bibliolatry". The widespread devotional worship of the Guru Granth Sahib in these temples has drawn comparisons to the Sikh scripture is being ritually treated like an idol. In this view, idolatry is any form of worship or holy reverence to any object, such as an icon, a ritualized direction, or a house of worship.

Scholars such as Eleanor Nesbitt state the Nanaksar Gurdwaras practice of offering food cooked by Sikh devotees to the Guru Granth Sahib, as well as curtaining the scripture during this ritual, as a form of idolatry. Baba Ishar Singh of the international network of Sikh temples has defended this practice because he states that the Sikh scripture is more than paper and ink.

According to Kristina Myrvold, every Sikh scripture copy is treated like a person and venerated with elaborate ceremonies which are a daily means of "merit bestowing ministrations". These daily ritual ministrations and paying of homage for the scripture by Sikhs, states Myrvold, is not unique to Sikhism. It moulds "meanings, values and ideologies" and creates a framework for congregational worship, states Myrvold, that is found in all major faiths.

See also

 Biblical infallibility
 Biblical literalism
 Bibliomancy
 Cult of personality
 Religious images in Christian theology

References 

Idolatry
Religious texts
Worship